Norway was represented by Jahn Teigen, with the song "Mil etter mil", at the 1978 Eurovision Song Contest, which took place on 22 April in Paris. "Mil etter mil" was chosen as the Norwegian entry at the Melodi Grand Prix on 18 March.

"Mil etter mil" is famous both for Teigen's notoriously bizarre stage performance in Paris, and for being the first song ever to score nul-points under the 12 points voting system. (It was said that one of the reasons for the introduction of the current system in 1975 had been that the European Broadcasting Union had considered it unlikely in the extreme that any song would finish the evening with a zero with national juries now able to vote for ten songs, rather than the three or five which had been the case with previous ranking systems used in the 1960s and which had led to so many going home empty-handed.)

Before Eurovision

Melodi Grand Prix 1978 
The Melodi Grand Prix 1978 was held at the studios of broadcaster NRK in Oslo, hosted by Egil Teige. The orchestra was conducted by Carsten Klouman. Eight songs took part in the final, with the winner chosen by a 9-member "expert" jury, which included Ellen Nikolaysen, who represented Norway in 1973 (as part of the Bendik Singers) and 1975 and Odd Børre, who represented Norway in 1968. The rankings of the jury members were used to calculate the result so the song with the lowest aggregate score was the winner.

At Eurovision 
On the night of the final Teigen performed second in the running order, following Ireland and preceding Italy. His stage performance appeared inexplicable at the time, involving braces-twanging and a huge split leap into the air which were completely at odds with the nature of the song. However it was later rumoured that Teigen was unhappy with the new arrangement the song had been given by NRK following MGP, and had performed in a deliberately inappropriate manner to vent his displeasure. Nevertheless the performance soon entered Eurovision legend, and is invariably included in montages put together to illustrate the contest's more absurd moments.

By the end of the night, no national jury had been persuaded to cast any votes in Norway's direction, and the country finished at the bottom of the scoreboard for a fifth time. The Norwegian jury awarded its 12 points to Ireland. It is worth noting that, had the Norwegian jury not awarded Finland its only 2 points of the evening, they would not have been alone at the foot of the table.

Voting 
Norway did not receive any points at the 1978 Eurovision Song Contest.

After Eurovision 
Far from being bitter about, or humiliated by, his Eurovision disaster, Teigen would subsequently use his notoriety very cleverly to become one of the most successful artists on the Norwegian musical scene, and made two further appearances at Eurovision in 1982 and 1983.

References

External links 
Full national final on nrk.no

1978
Countries in the Eurovision Song Contest 1978
1978
Eurovision
Eurovision